Point Break is a 1991 American crime action film directed by Kathryn Bigelow and written by W. Peter Iliff. It stars Patrick Swayze, Keanu Reeves, Lori Petty and Gary Busey. The film's title refers to the surfing term "point break", where a wave breaks as it hits a point of land jutting out from the coastline.

The film features Reeves as an undercover FBI agent who is tasked with investigating the identities of a group of bank robbers while he develops a complex relationship with the group's leader (Swayze).

Development of Point Break began in 1986, when Iliff wrote an initial treatment for the film. Bigelow soon developed the script with husband James Cameron, and filming took place four years later. It was shot across the western coast of the continental United States and was officially budgeted at $24 million, before being released for traditional viewing on July 12, 1991.

Point Break opened to a generally positive critical reception and critics praised the relationship between Reeves and Swayze. During its theatrical run, the film grossed over $83.5 million, and has since gained a cult following. Following the film's success, it spawned a remake that was released in 2015.

Plot
Former Ohio State quarterback and rookie FBI agent Johnny Utah assists experienced agent Angelo Pappas in investigating a string of bank robberies by the "Ex-Presidents": a gang of robbers who wear rubber masks of Ronald Reagan, Jimmy Carter, Richard Nixon and Lyndon B. Johnson. Rather than robbing the vault, they only demand the cash the tellers have in their drawers, and are gone within ninety seconds.

Pursuing Pappas's theory that the criminals are surfers, Utah goes undercover to infiltrate the surfing community. He fabricates a personal family tragedy to persuade orphaned surfer and restaurant waitress Tyler Ann Endicott to teach him to surf, after she saves him from drowning during his first attempt at surfing. Through her, he meets Bodhi, the charismatic leader of a gang of surfers consisting of Roach, Grommet, and Nathaniel. The group are initially wary of Utah, but accept him when Bodhi recognizes him as a former college football star who quit the sport due to a knee injury. As he masters surfing, Utah finds himself increasingly drawn to the surfers' adrenaline-charged lifestyle, Bodhi's philosophies, and Tyler. Following a clue retrieved by analyzing toxins found in the hair of one of the bank robbers, Utah and Pappas lead an FBI raid on another gang of surfers, resulting in the deaths of two of them. The raid inadvertently ruins a DEA undercover operation, as those surfers were wanted for separate charges regarding drug dealing, but they are determined not to be the Ex-Presidents.

Watching Bodhi's group surfing, Utah begins to suspect that they are the Ex-Presidents, noting how close a group they are and the way one of them moons other surfers in the same manner one of the robbers does when leaving a bank. Utah and Pappas stake out a bank and the Ex-Presidents appear. While wearing a Reagan mask, Bodhi leads Utah on a foot chase through the neighborhood, which ends when Utah's old knee injury flares up after jumping into a flood control channel. Despite still having a clear shot, the injured Utah is unwilling to kill Bodhi and allows him to escape, repeatedly shooting into the air instead.

At a campfire that night, it is confirmed that Bodhi and his gang are the Ex-Presidents. Tyler discovers Utah's FBI badge and angrily terminates their relationship after briefly holding him at gunpoint. Shortly afterwards, Bodhi coerces Utah into skydiving with the group. After the jump, Bodhi reveals that he knows Utah is an FBI agent and has arranged for his friend Rosie, a non-surfing thug, to hold Tyler hostage. Utah is blackmailed into participating in the Ex-Presidents' last bank robbery of the summer. As a result, Grommet is killed, along with an off-duty cop and a bank guard who attempt to foil the robbery. Outraged by Grommet's death, Bodhi knocks out Utah and leaves the scene.

Defying their superior, who arrests Utah for the armed robbery, Pappas and Utah head to the airport where Bodhi, Roach, and Nathaniel are about to leave for Mexico. During a shootout, Pappas and Nathaniel are killed and Roach is seriously wounded. With Roach aboard, Bodhi forces Utah onto the plane at gunpoint. Once airborne and over their intended drop zone, Bodhi and Roach put on their parachutes and jump from the plane, leaving Utah to take the blame. With no other parachutes available, Utah jumps from the plane with Bodhi's gun and intercepts him. After landing safely, Utah's knee gives out again, allowing Bodhi to escape Utah's grasp. Bodhi meets with Rosie and releases Tyler. Roach dies of his wounds, and Bodhi and Rosie leave with the money, with Tyler and Johnny watching on.

Nine months later, Utah tracks Bodhi to Bells Beach in Victoria, Australia where a record storm is producing lethal waves. This is an event Bodhi had talked about experiencing, calling it the "50-Year Storm". Utah attempts to bring Bodhi into custody, but Bodhi refuses. During a brawl in the surf, Utah manages to handcuff himself to Bodhi, who begs Utah to release him so he can ride the once-in-a-lifetime wave. Knowing Bodhi will not come back alive, Utah releases him, bids him farewell, and sees him step towards the wave. While the authorities watch Bodhi surf to his death, Utah walks away, throwing his FBI badge into the ocean.

Cast

Production
The film came close to production in 1986, with Matthew Broderick, Johnny Depp, Val Kilmer, and Charlie Sheen all being considered to play the Johnny Utah character, with Ridley Scott directing. However production fell through.

Four years later, after acquiring the screenplay, the producers of Point Break began looking for a director. At the time, executive producer James Cameron was married to director Kathryn Bigelow, who had just completed Blue Steel and was looking for her next project. Only W. Peter Iliff is credited for the screenplay, but Cameron has said that he did a considerable amount of writing with Bigelow for the final film, helping to establish a better plot flow.

Point Break was originally called Johnny Utah when Keanu Reeves was cast in the title role. The studio felt that this title said very little about surfing and by the time Patrick Swayze was cast, the film had been renamed Riders on the Storm after the famous song by The Doors. However, Jim Morrison's lyrics had nothing to do with the film and so that title was also rejected. It was not until halfway through filming that Point Break became the film's title because of its relevance to surfing.

Reeves liked the name of his character, as it reminded him of star athletes like Johnny Unitas and Joe Montana. He described his character as "a total control freak and the ocean beats him up and challenges him. After a while everything becomes a game. He becomes as amoral as any criminal. He loses the difference between right and wrong." Swayze felt that Bodhi was a lot like him and that they both shared "that wild-man edge."

Two months before filming, Lori Petty, Reeves and Swayze trained with former world-class professional surfer Dennis Jarvis on the Hawaiian island of Kauai. Jarvis remembers, "Patrick said he'd been on a board a couple of times, Keanu definitely had not surfed before, and Lori had never been in the ocean in her life." Shooting the surfing sequences proved to be challenging for all three actors, with Swayze cracking four of his ribs. For many of the surfing scenes, he refused to use a stunt double as he never had one for fight scenes or car chases. He also did the skydiving scenes himself and the film's aerial jump instructor Jim Wallace found that he was a natural and took to it right away. Swayze ended up making 55 jumps for the film. Swayze actually based aspects of his character after one of his stunt doubles, Darrick Doerner, a top big wave surfer. After learning to surf for the film, Reeves took a liking to it and took it up as a hobby.

Parts of the film were shot at Lake Powell in Utah, Wheeler and Ecola State Park in Oregon, and Malibu, Manhattan Beach, Santa Monica, Venice, and Fox Hills Mall in California. Although the final scene of the film is set at Bells Beach, Victoria, Australia, the scene was filmed at Indian Beach in Ecola State Park, located in Cannon Beach, Oregon.

Soundtrack

 Ratt – "Nobody Rides for Free"
 Concrete Blonde – "I Want You"
 Jimmy Buffett – "Volcano"
 The Jimi Hendrix Experience – "If 6 Was 9"
 School of Fish – "Rose Colored Glasses"
 Public Image Ltd. – "Criminal"
 Shark Island – "My City"
 Love – "7 and 7 Is"
 Loudhouse – "Smoke on the Water"
 Westworld – "So Long Cowboy"
 Little Caesar – "Down to the Wire"
 L.A. Guns – "Over the Edge"
 Liquid Jesus– "7 and 7 Is"
 Wire Train – "I Will Not Fall"
 Ice-T – "O.G. Original Gangster"
 Mark Isham – "Foot Chase"
 Sheryl Crow – "Hundreds of Tears"

Score album
On February 7, 2008, a score release for Point Break was released by La-La Land Records, featuring composer Mark Isham's score. This edition was limited to 2,000 units and features 65 minutes of score with liner notes by Dan Goldwasser that incorporate comments from both Bigelow and Isham. It is now out of print.

Reception

Box office
Point Break was released on July 12, 1991, in 1,615 theaters, grossing $8.5 million on its opening weekend, behind Terminator 2: Judgment Days (directed by Bigelow's then husband, James Cameron) second weekend and the openings of the re-issue of 101 Dalmatians and Boyz n the Hood. With a budget of $24 million, the film went on to make $43.2 million in North America and $40.3 million internationally for a worldwide total of $83.5 million.

Critical response
On Rotten Tomatoes, the film holds an approval rating of 71% based on 72 reviews, with an average rating of 6.2/10. The website's critics consensus reads: "Absurd, over-the-top, and often wildly entertaining, Point Break is here to show you that the human spirit is still alive." Metacritic reports a weighted average score of 58 out of 100, based on 20 critics, indicating "mixed or average reviews". Audiences polled by CinemaScore gave the film an average grade of "B+" on an A+ to F scale.

Roger Ebert of the Chicago Sun-Times gave the film three-and-a-half stars out of four and wrote "Bigelow is an interesting director for this material. She is interested in the ways her characters live dangerously for philosophical reasons. They aren't men of action, but men of thought who choose action as a way of expressing their beliefs." In her review for The New York Times, Janet Maslin praised Reeves' performance: "A lot of the snap comes, surprisingly, from Mr. Reeves, who displays considerable discipline and range. He moves easily between the buttoned-down demeanor that suits a police procedural story and the loose-jointed manner of his comic roles." Entertainment Weekly gave the film a "C+" rating and Owen Gleiberman wrote "Point Break makes those of us who don't spend our lives searching for the ultimate physical rush feel like second-class citizens. The film turns reckless athletic valor into a new form of aristocracy."

In his review for The Washington Post, Hal Hinson wrote "A lot of what Bigelow puts up on the screen bypasses the brain altogether, plugging directly into our viscera, our gut. The surfing scenes in particular are majestically powerful, even awe-inspiring. Bigelow's picture is a feast for the eyes, but we watch movies with more than our eyes. She seduces us, then asks us to be bimbos." Rolling Stone magazine's Peter Travers wrote, "Bigelow can't keep the film from drowning in a sea of surf-speak. But without her, Point Break would be no more than an excuse to ogle pretty boys in wet suits."

USA Today gave the film two out of four stars and Mike Clark wrote "Its purely visceral material (surf sounds, skydiving stunt work, a tough indoor shootout midway through) are first-rate. As for the tangibles that matter even more (script, acting, directorial control, credible relationships between characters), Break defies belief. Dramatically, it rivals the lowest surf yet this year." Time magazine's Richard Corliss wrote, "So how do you rate a stunningly made film whose plot buys so blithely into macho mysticism that it threatens to turn into an endless bummer? Looks 10, Brains 3."

Critics have commented on the central 'buddy' relationship of Bodhi and Johnny, and on the unusually equal dynamic in the romantic relationship of Tyler and Johnny (which Bigelow changed Peter Iliff's original script to create); Tyler is a "muscled, brash waitress with an androgynous name (Tyler) and physical features", and Johnny's "feminine edges nudge in nicely to her masculine ones. In nearly every scene they share, they are portrayed by the camera as equals."

In 2006, a special edition was released on DVD (In DVD was released on May 22, 2001). Entertainment Weekly gave it a "B" rating and wrote, "The making-of docs (at their best discussing Swayze's extracurricular skydiving—that really is him doing the Adios, amigo fall) will leave you hanging."

Legacy
The Daily Telegraph wrote that the film "certainly qualified as a cult favourite." Furthermore, Rolling Stone called Point Break "the greatest female-gaze action movie ever," citing the bodily condition of Reeves and Swayze, calling it a "wet Western."

Point Break was listed in the VH1 series I Love the 90s on the episode "1991". Many celebrities, including Dominic Monaghan, Mo Rocca, Michael Ian Black, Hal Sparks, and Chris Pontius, commented about the film and why it deserved to be included in the episode. Entertainment Weekly ranked Point Break as having one of the "10 Best Surfing Scenes" in cinema.

The film inspired a piece of cult theater, Point Break Live!, in which the role of Johnny Utah is played by an audience member chosen by popular acclamation after a brief audition. The new "Keanu" reads all of his lines from cue-cards for the duration of the show, "to capture the rawness of a Keanu Reeves performance even from those who generally think themselves incapable of acting."

Point Break was referenced in Hot Fuzz, where the scene of Utah emptying his magazine into the sky in frustration is watched by the lead characters and later re-enacted by Nick Frost's character.

Seattle-based Georgetown Brewing Company brews a "Bodhizafa" IPA, a "Johnny Utah" pale ale, and a "War Child" IPA.

Between 2016 and 2020, indie musician, JAWNY, went by the stage name "Johnny Utah" in reference to the Point Break character.

In The Avengers, Tony Stark dismissively calls Thor "Point Break," presumably a comparison of Thor's hair to Swayze's in that film. In Thor: Ragnarok, after several attempts Thor correctly guesses that "Point Break" is the activation code that Stark had set up for him in the Quinjet.

Alcon Entertainment and Warner Bros. released a remake of the film in 2015 titled Point Break, which received mostly negative reviews. James LeGros and BoJesse Christopher, two of the actors who played Ex-Presidents in the 1991 film, were cast as FBI directors.

See also
 Heist film
 List of cult films

References

External links

 
 
 
 

1990s buddy cop films
1990s heist films
1991 action thriller films
1991 films
American action adventure films
American action thriller films
American buddy cop films
American heist films
Cultural depictions of Jimmy Carter
Cultural depictions of Lyndon B. Johnson
Cultural depictions of Richard Nixon
Cultural depictions of Ronald Reagan
1990s English-language films
Films about bank robbery
Films about the Federal Bureau of Investigation
Films directed by Kathryn Bigelow
Films scored by Mark Isham
Films set in Australia
Films set in Los Angeles
Films set in Mexico
Films set on beaches
Films shot in Hawaii
Films shot in Los Angeles
Films shot in Oregon
Films shot in Utah
Largo Entertainment films
Skydiving in fiction
American surfing films
1990s American films